The Seneca Lake AVA is an American Viticultural Area around Seneca Lake in Upstate New York. The wine appellation is entirely contained within the larger Finger Lakes AVA, and includes portions of Ontario, Schuyler, Seneca, and Yates counties. The lake does not freeze in winter, and acts as a giant heat storage unit for the vineyards surrounding the lake, extending the growing season. The most commercially important grape variety in the region is Riesling, although a wide variety of Vitis vinifera and French hybrid grapes are grown.

In 1977, Glenora Wine Cellars was the first winery to open on Seneca Lake.  Other wineries soon followed, including Hermann J. Wiemer Vineyard and Wagner Vineyards, established by Stanley Wagner in 1979.

History
The Iroquois were the first to utilize the microclimates created by the lake's varying water temperatures. The Iroquois' fruit crops flourished. Later, white settlers planted only what they needed to survive or use for local barter, until the opening of the Erie Canal. Backyard fruit trees and arbors quickly grew into commercial orchards and vineyards.

The area’s earliest vineyard on record belonged to the Reverend William Boswick. In 1829, Boswick grew Catawba and Isabella grapes in his rectory garden located in Hammondsport, New York on the southern tip of Keuka Lake. He distributed cuttings to parishioners and soon offshoots from his vineyards spread throughout the region.

In 1866, the western shores of Seneca Lake became home to its first winery, the Seneca Lake Grape Wine Company. The winery planted  of grapes. At the time, it was the largest vineyard in the state. By 1869 they were producing  of Seneca Lake’s first commercial wine. Then, in 1882, New York State opened its Agricultural Experiment Station in Geneva, New York located at the north end of Seneca Lake. Its grape breeding and research programs helped to substantiate Seneca Lake as a prominent player in the grape growing industry.

In 1919, the passage of Prohibition strongly impacted the wine and grape growing industries. Only the largest wineries were able to survive by making grape juice and sacramental wine. Total area of Finger Lakes’ vineyards was cut in half. And many of the vineyards that remained were replanted to produce grape varieties popular for juice or for the fresh fruit market. When Prohibition was repealed, the wine and grape growing industry remained a shadow of its former self. The Seneca Lake Grape Wine Company had folded and area farmers struggled to survive in a much reduced New York State market.

The next significant change for the Seneca Lake grape growing and wine producing industry occurred during the late 1950s and 1960s. Two young European viticultural pioneers named Charles Fournier and Dr. Konstantin Frank began to research and experiment with Vinifera grapes in the Finger Lakes Region. Fournier and Frank’s research led them to Seneca Lake where they found the most favorable microclimates conducive for growing Vinifera grapes. In the early 1970s, Fournier planted  of Vinifera on the east side of Seneca Lake. At the same time, a German native named Hermann Wiemer bought and planted  of Vinifera on the west side of Seneca Lake. The success of these two vineyards along with the establishment of a wine research program at the New York State Agricultural Experiment Station in Geneva (which had been banned since its opening) helped to start the revitalization of Seneca Lake in the grape growing and wine producing industry.

References 

American Viticultural Areas
New York (state) wine
Geography of Ontario County, New York
Geography of Schuyler County, New York
Geography of Seneca County, New York
Geography of Yates County, New York
1988 establishments in New York (state)